Brotherhood is the first Japanese language studio album by the South Korean band N.Flying, released by FNC Entertainment on May 22, 2019.

Background 
On May 22, 2019, the group released their first full length album in Japan, entitled Brotherhood. All members involved in writing and composing the tracks for the album. 

The group also started their live tour in Japan as of the release of the album.

Track listing

Charts

References 

2019 albums
FNC Entertainment albums
Japanese-language albums